Bledius spectabilis, commonly known as the magnificent salt beetle, is a species of small rove beetle.

Description
This beetle is 5 to 7 millimetres long and has brightly coloured legs. The wing covers are brownish and as wide as they are long.

Distribution 
B. spectabilis inhabits the sea shores of the Caspian and Black Seas, the coasts of the Mediterranean from Asia Minor to Spain and Morocco, and the Atlantic coast as far north as the  Irish Sea and the North Sea.

Behaviour
Bledius spectabilis, shows very unusual behaviour for an insect in that it actively protects its larvae from the parasitic wasp Barycnemis blediator and from the predatory Dicheirotrichus gustavi.

References

External links
Images representing Bledius spectabilis  at Barcode of Life Data System

Staphylinidae
Beetles of Europe
Beetles described in 1857